Cruger is an unincorporated community in Woodford County, in the U.S. state of Illinois.

History
Cruger was laid out in 1856. The community's name honors William H. Cruger, a railroad official. A post office was established at Cruger in 1856, and remained in operation until 1909.

References

Unincorporated communities in Woodford County, Illinois
Unincorporated communities in Illinois